The Reykjanes Power Station (known as Reykjanesvirkjun ) is a geothermal power station located in Reykjanes at the southwestern tip of Iceland.

As of 2012, the power plant generates 100MWe from two 50MWe turbines, using steam and brine from a reservoir at 290 °C to 320 °C, which is extracted from 12 wells that are 2700m deep. This is the first time that geothermal steam of such high temperature has been used for electrical generation.

The power plant is open to the public and houses the Power Plant Earth interpretative exhibition.

See also 

 Geothermal power in Iceland
 List of largest power stations in the world
 List of power stations in Iceland
 Renewable energy in Iceland

References

External links 

 Photo Gallery from islandsmyndir.is

Geothermal power stations in Iceland